Prince Amadeus Alexander of Savoy, Duke of Montferrat (Amedeo Alessandro Maria; 5 October 1754 – 29 April 1755) was a member of the Royal House of Savoy. He was an infant son of the king of Sardinia Victor Amadeus III of Savoy and his wife Maria Antonietta of Spain (daughter of Philip V of Spain).

Biography
Born to the Duke and Duchess of Savoy at the Royal Palace of Turin, he was the couple's fourth child. His sisters included the future "grand daughters in law" of Louis XV of France, Princess Maria Giuseppina, who married the future Louis XVIII of France in 1771 and Princess Maria Teresa, wife of the future Charles X of France, married in 1773. His sister's brother in law was Louis XVI of France. Another sister Maria Carolina married Anthony of Saxony.

His brothers included the last three kings of Sardinia from the mainline; the future Charles Emmanuel IV, Victor Emmanuel I and Charles Felix of Sardinia.

Death
Amadeus Alexander died on 29 April 1755, in Turin, at the age of six months. He was buried in the Basilica of Superga, traditional burial site of the House of Savoy.

Ancestry

References 

1754 births
1755 deaths
18th-century Italian people
Burials at the Basilica of Superga
Nobility from Turin
Princes of Savoy
Dukes of Montferrat
Royalty and nobility who died as children